2000 Won (hangul: 이천원) is a South Korean male duo formed in 2013. The duo consists of friends Kim Hyo-Bin and Kim Il-Do who came to prominence on K-pop Star 2, finishing in the Top Four. From this success, the pair were signed by Reve Entertainment in July of the same year and in March 2014 made their debut.

Debut
Relatively unknown, 2000 Won made their first TV appearance on the second series of Good Sunday's K-pop Star - covering Park Jin-young's Elevator; Sistar's 나혼자 (Alone); Sanulrim's 개구쟁이 (Naughty Boy); 2NE1's Lonely and Sim Soo-bong's Million Roses. After increased popularity, the band signed for Reve Entertainment. Subsequently, on March 11 of the next year, they announced their upcoming debut titled "Beautiful". The next day, the two released the teaser for the single and announced that fellow K-pop artist Ailee would be featuring. The single was then released March 14.

Members 
Kim Hyo-bin (김효빈)
Kim Il-do (김일도)

Discography

Singles

References

External links
 

K-pop music groups
South Korean boy bands
South Korean hip hop groups
South Korean pop music groups
South Korean contemporary R&B musical groups
South Korean dance music groups
South Korean musical duos
Musical groups established in 2013
2013 establishments in South Korea
K-pop Star participants